Stacey Bendet (born 1978) is an American fashion designer who is the founder, chief executive officer and creative director of Alice + Olivia, a contemporary clothing company based in New York City. She is the Founder of Creatively, a networking platform for the creative industry, and co-founder of the #ShareTheMicNow movement, which was created in an effort to help amplify African-American women's voices.

Early life and education
Bendet was born in 1978 to Olivia (née Bendet) and Joseph Daniel Wiener. Bendet is of Jewish heritage and had a bat mitzvah celebration. Bendet's father ran a textile import business, and was "involved in one of the country's leading lace-manufacturing companies" while she herself was interested in fashion and clothing from a young age. Bendet graduated from Horace Greeley High School in Chappaqua, New York and studied international relations and French at the University of Pennsylvania, graduating in 1999.

Career
In 2002, Bendet founded Alice + Olivia. Bendet's desire to make "a trouser sexy" and "the focus of an outfit" led to her modifying a pair of jeans that were cut slim at the hip to create the illusion of elongated legs and a lean silhouette. Designer Lisa Kline noticed her walking by and ordered 20 sets of the outfit, which provided an opportunity for Bendet to launch a collection based around that concept at the Russian Tea Room. Soon after, the department store Barneys New York placed an order, and Andrew Rosen, developer of the Theory fashion line, offered to finance Bendet's new business.

The brand features ready-to-wear, gowns, shoes, tech accessories, and handbags. Freestanding boutiques have opened in over 30 major cities around the world, with a current total of 38 stores.

In 2020, she founded and launched Creatively, a networking platform for the creative industry. Later that year, she co-founded an Instagram campaign called #ShareTheMicNow in an effort to bring African-American women's voices to the forefronts of predominately white women's Instagram accounts in an "account takeover" format.

Personal life
She married film producer Eric Eisner, the son of former Walt Disney Company executive Michael Eisner, on the Caribbean island of Anguilla in 2008. The couple have three children: Eloise Breckenridge Eisner, Scarlet Haven Eisner, and Athena Belle Eisner. She splits her time between New York and Los Angeles.

Bendet practices Ashtanga Vinyasa yoga.

Bendet has appeared on the Vanity Fair Best-Dressed list four years in a row and is in the Best-Dressed Hall of Fame.

References

Living people
American fashion designers
American women fashion designers
20th-century American Jews
1978 births
Jewish fashion designers
Schools of the Sacred Heart alumni
Place of birth missing (living people)
University of Pennsylvania School of Arts and Sciences alumni
People from Chappaqua, New York
Horace Greeley High School alumni
21st-century American Jews
20th-century American women
21st-century American women